{{Infobox person
| name         = Charlie Wernham
| image        = 
| imagesize    = 
| alt          = 
| caption      = 
| birth_name   = 
| birth_date   = 
| birth_place  = Billericay, Essex, England
| death_date   = 
| death_place  = 
| occupation   = Comedian, actor
| years_active = 2008–present
| known        = {{Plainlist|
Britain's Got Talent (2008)
 School of Comedy (2009–2010)
 Bad Education (2012–2014, 2022–present)
 Hollyoaks 
 EastEnders (2021–2022)
}}
| spouse       = 
}}

Charlie Wernham (born 3 October 1994) is an English comedian and actor who is known for auditioning on the second series of the ITV talent show Britain's Got Talent and for his role as Robbie Roscoe in Hollyoaks. He currently plays Mitchell in Bad Education and has appeared in The Inbetweeners, School of Comedy and Some Girls. He played Aaron Monroe in EastEnders from 2021 to 2022.

 Early life 

Wernham was born in Billericay, Essex. He started his stand-up comedy act at the age of eight, winning his first talent show at eight. He went on to win three more contests. His father, Dave, helps him write his jokes and structure the routine. Wernham's favourite comedians are Ed Byrne, Peter Kay and Lee Evans.

 Britain's Got Talent 

In 2008, Wernham auditioned for the second series of the ITV talent show Britain's Got Talent in London, where he performed a variety of jokes. Judge Piers Morgan commented that the jokes were terrible but delivered a confident performance. Simon Cowell said that "We've had some rotten comedians on this show, but you're the only one who's made me laugh and told jokes that I could understand". Amanda Holden commented that Wernham has "made her moan". Wernham received three 'yes' votes from the judges and was put through to the next round. He made it through to the live semi-finals.

In the semi-final on 29 May 2008, he performed a stand-up comedy routine. The performance brought largely positive comments from the judges, though Morgan and Holden said that the jokes were "terrible" but that they still loved the act. Cowell compared him to a funny version of Jim Davidson. He failed to make it through to the final.

 Acting career 
After the show, Wernham began attending the Sylvia Young Theatre School at weekends. He appeared on the E4 comedy The Inbetweeners in the episode "Work Experience" playing Danny Moore, a pupil who beats up Simon Cooper (Joe Thomas). He also starred in the E4 show School of Comedy, playing several characters. The show began airing on 2 October 2009. He appeared in the third series of Harry & Paul on BBC Two in late 2010. He also played the main role Mitchell in the BBC 3 series Bad Education, written by comedian and actor Jack Whitehall, from 2012 to 2014 and also appeared in the 2015 spinoff film. Between 2013 and 2016 he regularly appeared as Robbie Roscoe in Hollyoaks. In 2021, he became a series regular in EastEnders as Aaron Monroe, reuniting him with Gillian Taylforth, who played his mother on Hollyoaks. Wernham returned to Bad Education'' for the 2022 reunion special and became co-lead of the show, alongside Layton Williams, for the fourth series.

Filmography
Adapted from IMDb.

References

External links 
 
 

1994 births
Britain's Got Talent contestants
English male child actors
English male television actors
Living people
People from Billericay